Galin Tashev (born 2 February 1997) is a Bulgarian footballer who currently plays as a defender for Sportist Svoge.

Career
Tashev hasn't made his league debut for the club yet but already took part in 3 matches for the Bulgarian Cup during the 2014–15 campaign. The first one being against Spartak Varna. The match was won by Levski with 7–1. Tashev started amongst the first 11 in another Cup game against Montana   and got on as a substitute against Haskovo.

In June 2017, Tashev was loaned to Lokomotiv Sofia.

In June 2018, Tashev signed with Second League club Montana.

References

External links
 
 Profile at levski.bg
 Profile at LevskiSofia.info

1997 births
Living people
People from Nova Zagora
Bulgarian footballers
Bulgaria youth international footballers
Bulgaria under-21 international footballers
First Professional Football League (Bulgaria) players
Second Professional Football League (Bulgaria) players
PFC Levski Sofia players
PFC Nesebar players
SFC Etar Veliko Tarnovo players
FC Lokomotiv 1929 Sofia players
FC Montana players
Neftochimic Burgas players
FC Sportist Svoge players
Association football defenders